Beyraq may refer to:
 Beyraq, Ardabil
 Beyraq, East Azerbaijan